Samoa, Queen of the Jungle is a 1968 Italian adventure film directed by Guido Malatesta.

Cast

 Roger Browne as Clint Lomas 
 Edwige Fenech as Samoa 
 Ivy Holzer as Nancy White 
 Ivano Staccioli as Moreau 
 Andrea Aureli as Stark 
 Umberto Ceriani as Alain 
 Tullio Altamura as Professor Dawson 
 Wilbert Bradley as Campu 
 Femi Benussi as Yasmin

References

External links

 
1968 films
1968 adventure films
Italian adventure films
Films directed by Guido Malatesta
Films set in Africa
Jungle girls
Films scored by Angelo Francesco Lavagnino
1960s Italian-language films
1960s Italian films